The 1929–30 season was the 53rd Scottish football season in which Dumbarton competed at national level, entering the Scottish Football League and the Scottish Cup.  In addition Dumbarton competed in the Dumbartonshire Cup.

Scottish League

With just 5 wins to show for their efforts in the league campaign up to the new year, it was to prove yet another fruitless season for Dumbarton, their eighth season in a row in the Second Division, and in the end finished 16th out of 20, with 30 points - 27 behind champions Leith Athletic.

Scottish Cup

Dumbarton were knocked out in the first round by Cowdenbeath.

Dumbartonshire Cup
For the first time since 1923, Dumbarton won the Dumbartonshire Cup, beating Clydebank in the final.

Friendly

Player statistics

|}

Source:

Transfers

Players in

Players out 

In addition John Jackson and Alex McIssac all played their last games in Dumbarton 'colours'.

Source:

References

Dumbarton F.C. seasons
Scottish football clubs 1929–30 season